Fury of Five (also commonly known as Fury of V) is an American hardcore band from Asbury Park, New Jersey.

History 
Fury of Five formed in 1994. Their early creative output limited to tracks on compilations, Fury of Five released two 7"s as well as a full-length album entitled No Reason to Smile in 1996.  The band toured extensively throughout the Northeastern United States with bands such as Madball, Earth Crisis, and Fear Factory, and completed two European tours with Integrity and Pro-Pain. Two releases on Victory Records followed, which were At War with the World in 1998 and This Time It's Personal in 2000.

Discography

Singles 
"Convicted and Condemned" 7" (1994)
"Telling It Like It Is!" 7" (1995)
"Real Is Back!" 7" (2014)

Demos 
The High Cost of Dying (1995)
Reflections of Reality (1995)

Studio albums 
No Reason to Smile (1996)
At War with the World (1998)
This Time It's Personal (2000)

Compilations 
Jersey Style (2007)
Fast Break! Records Sampler (2014)

Music videos 
Do or Die – At War with the World
Taking Respect – At War with the World

References

External links 
  Fury of Five on Myspace
 
 Victory Records page 

Hardcore punk groups from New Jersey
Metalcore musical groups from New Jersey
Musical groups from New Jersey
Musical groups established in 1994
Musical groups disestablished in 2000
Victory Records artists
American nu metal musical groups
Asbury Park, New Jersey
Rapcore groups
1994 establishments in New Jersey